Mirta Busnelli (born January 13, 1946) is an Argentine actress.

Awards

Nominations
 2013 Martín Fierro Awards
 Best secondary actress (for Los vecinos en guerra)

References

Argentine actresses
Living people
1946 births